Edwin Pratt may refer to:
 Edwin T. Pratt (1930–1969), American civil rights activist
 Edwin H. Baker Pratt (1913–1975), American educator and headmaster of Buckingham Browne & Nichols
 Edwin Hartley Pratt (1849–1930), American homeopath and founder of orificial surgery
 E. J. Pratt (1882–1964), Canadian poet